Yush, Yoosh or Yoush may refer to:
 Yush, Mazandaran
 Yush, South Khorasan
 Kristal Yush (born 1982), American female hammer thrower
 Yush, a 1994 novel by Jamaican born British author Victor Headley